The 2019 Super3 Series (known for commercial reasons as the Kumho Tyre Super3 Series) was the twelfth season of the Super3 Series, since its inception in 2008. Following an agreement between V8 Touring Cars and Supercars, the series undertook a name change from the "V8 Touring Car National Series" to "Super3", although the series will continue to be run by category managers Rob and Liam Curkpatrick.

The defending champion for the 2019 season is Tyler Everingham, whilst Jim Pollicina and Andy Cantrell are the respective Kumho and Heritage defending champions.

Teams and drivers 
The following teams and drivers are currently under contract to compete in the 2019 championship:

Calendar
The calendar for the 2019 championship consisted of five rounds, including four that ran in support of Supercars events:

Calendar changes
 The category returned to Sandown Raceway for the Sandown Shannons Nationals. 
 Sydney Motorsport Park was removed from the calendar after being omitted from the Supercars calendar.

Results and standings

Season summary

Series standings

References

External links
 

Super3 Series